The Panama Masters was a golf tournament on the Tour de las Américas from 2002 to 2005. It was hosted at Summit Golf & Resort in Panama City, Panama. In 2004 and 2005 it was co-sanctioned by the Challenge Tour.

Winners

Notes

References

External links
Coverage on the Challenge Tour's official site

Former Challenge Tour events
Golf tournaments in Panama